José Nascimento (born 1947) is a Portuguese film director.

Filmography
Os Lobos (2007)
Too Late (2000)
Reporter X (1987)
Silêncios do Olhar (documentary) (2016)
Tavira Islâmica (documentary) (2012)
Terra de Pão Terra de Luta (documentary) (1976)
Pela Razão que Têm (documentary) (1976)

References

External links
 

Portuguese film directors
1947 births
Living people
People from Lisbon
Portuguese people of Brazilian descent
Portuguese people of Spanish descent